Jining Rail Transit is a public transport system under construction in Jining, Shandong, China.

The first phase to be completed will be the Confucius and Mencius tourist line, which employs BYD SkyRail monorail technology. Originally, construction was scheduled to be completed by 2020, but due to the project lacking approval from the National Development and Reform Commission, its completion was delayed.

Lines under construction

Planned lines

References 

Transport in Jining
Monorails in China